"The Invaders" is episode 15 of season 2 (and episode 51 overall) of the American television anthology series The Twilight Zone. The episode, which originally aired January 27, 1961, starred Agnes Moorehead. It was written by Richard Matheson, directed by Douglas Heyes, and scored by Jerry Goldsmith. Distinctive features of this episode include a near-solo performance by one character (interacting with miniature puppet "characters"), and an almost complete lack of dialogue. The protagonist portrayed by Moorehead often cries out in pain, terror, etc., but never speaks.

Opening narration

Plot
An old woman lives alone in a remote cabin. She is dressed shabbily, and there are no modern conveniences in her abode. After hearing a strange deafening noise above her kitchen roof, she is accosted by small intruders that come from a miniature flying saucer that has landed on her rooftop. Two tiny figures, which appear to be robots or beings wearing pressure suits, emerge from the craft.

The small figures attack the woman, using small, pistol-like weapons that leave radiation burns on her skin, and, after following her into her cabin, slashing her ankle and hand with her own kitchen knife. She eventually kills one, wrapping it in a blanket and beating it until it is still, then throwing it into the burning fireplace. She follows the other to the saucer-ship on her roof, which she proceeds to attack with a hatchet.

A voice speaking in English emanates from within the craft. The intruder frantically warns that his partner, Gresham, is dead; and that the planet is inhabited by a race of giants and impossible to defeat. The side of the ship reads U.S. Air Force Space Probe No. 1. The "tiny" invaders were human astronauts from Earth; the woman in the small farmhouse belongs to a race of giant humanoids native to another planet. She finishes destroying the ship and then climbs back down from the roof into the house, exhausted.

Closing narration

On radio
When the episode was adapted for the Twilight Zone radio dramas, starring Kathy Garver, the story was changed from an old non-speaking woman to an elderly couple.

References

Bibliography

External links
 

1961 American television episodes
The Twilight Zone (1959 TV series season 2) episodes
Television episodes written by Richard Matheson
Fiction portraying humans as aliens
Fiction about giants
Television episodes directed by Douglas Heyes